Filip Stamenković (born 15 September 1998) is a Serbian football player who plays for Uzbekistani club PFK Metallurg Bekabad.

Club career
He made his debut in the Russian Football National League for FC Veles Moscow on 29 August 2021 in a game against FC Akron Tolyatti.

References

External links
 
 Profile by Russian Football National League

1998 births
Sportspeople from Niš
Living people
Serbian footballers
Association football defenders
FK Radnički Beograd players
FK Dinamo Vranje players
FK Zlatibor Čajetina players
FC Veles Moscow players
PFK Metallurg Bekabad players
Serbian First League players
Serbian SuperLiga players
Russian First League players
Serbian expatriate footballers
Expatriate footballers in Russia
Serbian expatriate sportspeople in Russia
Expatriate footballers in Uzbekistan
Serbian expatriate sportspeople in Uzbekistan